Prabhjot Singh is a field hockey forward for the Indian National Hockey Team. He is best known for his fast and attacking play.

Career
Prabhjot debuted for the Men's National Team in 2001. He was part of the national squad in the 2004 Athens Olympic, where India finished in 7th place. Apart from representing India in hockey, he is also an officer in Indian Oil. He was the captain of the Sher-e-Punjab team in the World Series Hockey in 2012. Prabhjot is an alumnus of Jamia Millia Islamia, New Delhi.

Awards
He was awarded the Arjuna Award in 2008 for exceptional performance as an Indian striker.

Controversy
During FIH World Cup, 2010 he showed the middle finger to the home crowd after a loss 2–4 loss against Argentina. He later apologized for this act.

References

External links
 

Olympic field hockey players of India
Male field hockey forwards
Field hockey players at the 2004 Summer Olympics
Asian Games medalists in field hockey
World Series Hockey players
2002 Men's Hockey World Cup players
2010 Men's Hockey World Cup players
Recipients of the Arjuna Award
Field hockey players from Jalandhar
Living people
1980 births
Field hockey players at the 2002 Asian Games
Field hockey players from Punjab, India
Indian male field hockey players
Asian Games silver medalists for India
Medalists at the 2002 Asian Games
Jamia Millia Islamia alumni
Field hockey players at the 2010 Commonwealth Games
Commonwealth Games silver medallists for India
Commonwealth Games medallists in field hockey
Medallists at the 2010 Commonwealth Games